Éric Deslauriers (born March 21, 1981) is the Director of Football Operations for the Montreal Alouettes of the Canadian Football League (CFL). As a player, he played professionally as a Canadian football slotback who played his entire nine-year career with the Alouettes where he was part of two Grey Cup champion teams. He played college football at Eastern Michigan University.

Early life
Deslauriers was born in Gatineau, Quebec, and attended Champlain College in Sherbrooke in the 2000–01 season. He became the starting quarterback for the Cougar team upon his arrival. In 10 games that season as the Cougars QB, he had 56 rushing attempts for 232 yards and three rushing touchdowns as well as completing 77 of 177 passes for 1347 yards and 10 passing Touchdowns. He was named a first team all-star as QB that season.

College career
In 2002, Deslauriers received a full football scholarship from the NCAA's Division 1 Mid-American Conference's Eastern Michigan University. After playing the quarterback position all of his life, the Eagles' coaching staff decided to tap into Deslauriers' natural athletic abilities, (6'4 215 lbs), and switched him to the wide receiver position because of a surplus of quarterbacks on the team.

After sitting out the 2002 season as a redshirt, Deslauriers finally arrived as a force to be reckoned with in the 2004 season. Deslauriers had 84 receptions that year for 1,257 yards and an EMU-record 13 touchdown receptions, all while being named the team MVP that year.

Deslauriers completed his Communications major at EMU. He finished his football career at EMU as the Eagles' career leader in touchdown receptions, with 27, total receiving yards, 3,250, and most receptions with 248. He shares the EMU record for touchdowns in a game with 4. Tied an EMU record for points in a game with 26 on November 6, 2004. He also had 6 games with his receptions numbers in double figures, he had 2, 14-reception games, had 14 games with 100 plus yards receiving and recorded a career best 209 yards at Ball State on October 9, 2004. Deslauries earned 4 varsity letters, (2003, 2004, 2005, 2006), and finished 5th in Mid-American Conference history with 248 receptions and 8th in league history with 3,250 yards while also putting together an amazing 35 game streak with at least one reception.

Professional career
After trying out for the Pittsburgh Steelers of the National Football League, Deslauriers signed a 4-year contract with the Montreal Alouettes of the Canadian Football League. He was Montreal's 7th overall draft pick in the 2006 CFL Draft. In his first year with limited playing time in 2007, he had 23 receptions for 325 yards and one touchdown. He finished his career having played in 115 regular season games, recording 99 receptions for 1,334 yards and three touchdowns.

Administrative career
Deslauriers retired as a player in February 2016 but stayed with the Alouettes as a football operations assistant and scout. He was named as the team's Player Personnel Coordinator on July 18, 2019 shortly after the dismissal of the team's general manager, Kavis Reed. He was promoted to Director of Football Operations after the 2019 Montreal Alouettes season on December 18, 2019.

References

External links
 Montreal Alouettes bio
 Montreal Alouettes player bio

1981 births
American football wide receivers
Canadian football slotbacks
Canadian players of American football
Eastern Michigan Eagles football players
Eastern Michigan University alumni
French Quebecers
Living people
Montreal Alouettes players
Players of Canadian football from Quebec
Sportspeople from Gatineau
Canadian Football League scouts